The first USS Patterson (DD-36) was a modified  in the United States Navy during World War I and later in the United States Coast Guard, designated as CG-16. She was named for Daniel Patterson.

Patterson was laid down on 29 March 1910 by William Cramp & Sons, Philadelphia; launched on 29 April 1911; sponsored by Miss Georgeanne Pollock Patterson; and commissioned on 11 October 1911.

Pre-World War I
Patterson departed Philadelphia on 23 October 1911, calling at Newport, Rhode Island, and New York City, before arriving at Boston on 2 November, her homeport for operations off the New England Coast, the Virginia Capes, and south to Charleston, South Carolina; Pensacola, Florida; and Guantánamo Bay, Cuba. She arrived off Vera Cruz from Pensacola on 20 May 1914 and headed home four days later.

World War I
As America entered World War I, Patterson patrolled along the New England Coast in the approaches to Newport and Boston to safeguard inbound trans-Atlantic convoys. One patrol mission took her as far north as St. Johns, Newfoundland.

The first United States help to the hard-pressed allies was the assignment of US destroyers to the British Fleet to help combat enemy submarines that threatened to cut the sea lifelines to the British Isles. Patterson was the flagship of the second division of destroyers to cross the Atlantic on this mission. But the destroyers could not make it across the North Atlantic without refueling. Newly commissioned fleet oiler , whose executive officer and chief engineer was Lieutenant Chester W. Nimitz, stationed herself in mid-Atlantic, between Boston and Queenstown, Ireland.

Patterson led Division 5 out of Boston Harbor on 21 May 1917 and made rendezvous with Maumee the morning of 28 May. She was the first destroyer to maneuver alongside Maumee to receive fuel oil enabling her to complete the Atlantic crossing. The division arrived Queenstown, Ireland, on 1 June 1917. There Patterson and her sister destroyers received British signal books and depth charges.

Patterson began patrol and escort in the approaches to Queenstown on 5 June. On 12 June, she dropped depth charges to help drive away a German U-boat attacking SS Indian. A collision with His Majesty's tug Dreadful at the entrance to Berehaven Harbour, Ireland, the night of 1 January 1918, damaged Patterson's bow but she resumed regular escort and patrol on 5 February. Two days later she rescued 12 survivors of steamship Mexico City, torpedoed by a German submarine. Patterson, patrolling in the Irish Sea on 17 May, dropped depth charges that drove away German . She continued patrol out of Queenstown until 4 June, then departed for the United States.

On 16 June, one day out of Bermuda, she rescued survivors of the Norwegian bark Kringsjaa, sunk by German . She landed the survivors at the Cape May Naval Station and continued on to the Philadelphia Navy Yard, arriving on 18 June for overhaul. She departed Norfolk, Virginia on 17 August for Tompkinsville, New York. There she joined the escort of battleship  bound for Norfolk. On 22 August, she got underway from that base as flagship of the “Patterson Group”, a special hunting squadron that included 11 submarine chasers.

The Patterson Group hunted U-boats north from the Virginia Capes to New York. When cargoman Felix Taussig mistook submarine chaser  for an enemy submarine and opened fire on 27 August, Patterson helped rescue the survivors and carried seven of the injured into New York Harbor for transfer to US Navy hospital ship . She dropped depth charges to drive away a German U-boat on 3 September, continuing hunter-killer patrols along the eastern seaboard until the special hunting group disbanded on 23 November.

Inter-war period
Patterson entered the Philadelphia Navy Yard on 1 January 1919, remaining there until she was transferred to the US Coast Guard on 28 April 1924. She was stationed at Stapleton, New York and part of the Rum Patrol.

Her hulk was sold for scrapping on 2 May 1934 in accordance with the London Naval Treaty. She was struck from the Naval Vessel Register on 28 June.

References

External links
 
 hazegray.org: USS Patterson

 

Paulding-class destroyers
Monaghan-class destroyers
World War I destroyers of the United States
Ships built by William Cramp & Sons
1910 ships